This page is an overview of the results of Poland at the World Single Distance Championships.

List of medalists

Medal table

Medals by discipline

Medals by championship

World Speed Skating Championships
Speed skating in Poland